Mahmudabad Estate or Mahmoodabad Estate, governed from Mahmudabad, was one of the largest feudal estates in the erstwhile Kingdom of Oudh. The rulers are generally referred to as Raja of Mahmudabad or Raja of Mahmoodabad.

History
The Mahmudabad Estate was founded in 1677 by Raja Mahmud Khan.

References

External links

Indian royalty
1677 establishments in Asia